Luigi Ugaglia (born 2 December 1897, date of death unknown) was an Italian racing cyclist. He rode in the 1924 Tour de France.

References

External links
 

1897 births
Year of death missing
Italian male cyclists
Cyclists from Cremona